Léonard Defrance, born at Liège in 1735, was a scholar of J. B. Coclers. He painted historical pieces of large and small dimensions, also landscapes, game, fruit, flowers, and architecture. He was the first professor of design at the Academy of Liège, established by the Prince Velbruck, and afterwards filled the same post in the École Centrale of the department of Ourthe. He died at Liège in 1805.

References

Further reading
 (see index).

External links

1735 births
1805 deaths
18th-century painters from the Prince-Bishopric of Liège